One Step Closer may refer to:

 One Step Closer (band), an American melodic hardcore band

Albums 
 One Step Closer (The Doobie Brothers album) or the title song, 1980
 One Step Closer (Gavin Christopher album), 1986
 One Step Closer (Marta Sánchez album), English-language version of Azabache, 1997
 One Step Closer (The String Cheese Incident album) or the title song, 2005
 One Step Closer (Sylvia album) or the title song, 1985
 One Step Closer (EP), by Saint Lu, 2004
 One Step Closer, by the Dells, or the title song, 1984
 One Step Closer, by Heinz Winckler, or the title song, 2002

Songs 
 "One Step Closer" (Linkin Park song), 2000
 "One Step Closer" (S Club Juniors song), 2002; covered by American Juniors, 2003
 "One Step Closer" (U2 song), 2004
 "One Step Closer", by Asia from Asia, 1982
 "One Step Closer", by Bon Jovi from Lost Highway, 2007
 "One Step Closer", by R. Kelly from Write Me Back, 2012
 "One Step Closer", by Simple Minds from Cry, 2002